Cheung Ah-yim; b. 1824–d. 1893) a.k.a. Jeung Yim, Cheung Yim, Cheung Hung-sing, Jeong Hung-sing, Jeong Hong-sing, Zhang Yan, Zhang Hongsheng; is recognized as an important contributor (co-founder) to the expansion of Choy Lee Fut - a Southern Chinese martial arts system, and was the most famous of Chan Heung's disciple to emerge from the Choy Lee Fut System.

Cheung Yim was an orphan, came from a broken family, a student of martial art masters such as Lee Yau-san (Chan Heung's teacher), Chan Heung, and the Monk Ching Cho Wo Sheung (Green Grass Monk 青草和尚), co-founder to the Choy Lee Fut system, founder of the Great Victory School (Hung Sing Kwoon - 鴻勝舘) and the Hung Sing Choy Lee Fut system 鴻勝蔡李佛拳, a notable revolutionary, accomplished fighter, a Hung Mun Red Pole (426 Enforcer), and father of the largest and longest running school of southern Chinese Martial Arts.

Cheung Yim - Cheung Hung-sing 張炎 (張鴻勝)

Cheung Yim aka Cheung Hung-sing was one of the most famous figures to emerge from the Choy Lee Fut Kung Fu legacy.  He was born in 1824 and died in 1893. He was a native of Sanshui Dong Ling Village where they all possessed the Cheung 張 surname. His birth year was calculated from his age of death and the year he died by counting backward from his death date. Prior to 1998, the Fut San Hung Sing Kwoon was dormant, and information coming from the source was not available until recent years. Once the Fut San Hung Sing Kwoon re-opened in 2001, Choy Lee Fut disciples were privy to new information about Cheung Yim and his life, more than what was previously known.

As a young boy, Cheung Yim was learning the Lee Gar system under Lee Yau San. But, at the time, he was under the care of his uncle because allegedly his parents were killed by the Qing Empire.  One day, his uncle had to leave China for business and would now be returning to China and couldn't bring his nephew with him. He hoped his friend by the name of Chan Heung would be able to look after his 12 year old nephew, so they went to King Mui to ask him. At first Chan Heung had to deny any care for the boy, but after much pleading, Chan Heung took Cheung Yim on as a handyman/caretaker.

Cheung Yim loved Kung Fu and couldn't help but memorize what Chan Heung was teaching to his students  as he was doing his daily chores. At night, he would practice his stolen Choy Lee Fut while everyone slept. He was caught one night when Chan Heung was taking a walk around the village. He confronted Cheung Yim who admitted to what he did. But, Chan Heung saw the potential in this young boy who never properly learned the Choy Lee Fut system, so he decided to privately teach him as long as their secret can be kept a secret.

One day in 1841, Chan Heung was away on business and his students started bullying Cheung Yim, who, tried his best not to fight back. But he lost his cool and gave Chan Heung's students a good thrashing.  They reported what happened to their parents, who, then complained to Chan Heung, demanding he ask Cheung Yim to leave the King Mui Village. But, Chan Heung didn't want to just end Cheung Yim's training just like that. So, he instructed the now 17 year old Cheung Yim to go to the Pak Pai Mountains near Guangxie and find an elusive monk by the name of Ching Cho and tell him why he was sent to look for this monk.

In 1841 Cheung Yim arrived at the Pak Pai Mountain and found the Monk with the name of Ching Cho. But, Ching Cho was a wanted fugitive for being a co-founder of the monk, and knew his life was in danger so he needed to be as discreet as he could, and be aware of strangers. So, when the young Cheung Yim showed up asking questions, Ching Cho needed to know if what he stated was true or whether or not this was a government assassin sent to kill him.  He then asked Cheung Yim to demonstrate his martial arts for him. Once Cheung Yim started his form, Ching Cho immediately recognized Cheung Yim's gung fu as authentic Shaolin martial arts.

Monk Ching Cho then admitted to being the monk Cheung Yim was looking for and for the next 8 years he started training him in the art of Fut Gar Kuen. In those 8 years Cheung Yim mastered all Monk Ching Cho to teach which included Chinese Medicine in addition to mentoring Cheung Yim in the art of Revolution. Also since he was a co-founder of the Hung Mun and known as the father of the Sam Hop Hui, he had the power to make Cheung Yim a 426 Red Pole Enforcer known as Hung Kwun 
(). This is a rank and position usually reserved for masters of the Martial Arts with a role more like an Army General.

In 1849, Monk Ching Cho Wo Sheung completed Cheung Yim's gung fu training. Since he had plans for Cheung Yim, he instructed him to go to Fut San to contact the Triad Society leaders there and offer to help train the revolutionary fighters who were preparing for the Tai Ping Rebellion in 1851.

One final thing Monk Ching Cho had to give Cheung Yim was a new name.  He changed his first name of  Yim 炎 and replaced it with "Hung Victory" pronounced as Hung-sing 洪勝.  This was a name that had its roots deeply embedded in the Hung Mun secret Society and was even used by various tongs, and even a triad gang in Hong Kong, and found on the flags of the Hung Mun's various tongs. The meaning behind "Hung Victory" is it is a shortened version of the greater meaning of "The 'Hung - 洪' will be 'Victorious' - 勝 in its mission to over throw the Qing Empire to restore the Ming Dyansty back to power".  This was the last we hear of Monk Ching Cho Wo Sheung who most likely passed away shortly after this.

The newly named Cheung Hung-sing arrived in the City of Fut San, and immediately made contact with the Triad leaders and was ready to start training the fighters. But before he could do that respectfully, he needed to make contact with the leading martial art authority in Fut San which at the time was Wing Chun's Leung Jan and get permission to open a school in the area.  According to the Fut San Hung Sing Kwoon's history, when Cheung Hung-sing arrived at Leung Jan's home, he was met by Leung Jan's disciple who was offering him some tea.  As Cheung Hung-sing went to accept the tea, Leung Jan's student suddenly attacked Cheung Hung Sing with a Biu Gee, or thrusting fingers to the eyes.  Cheung Hung-sing evaded the strike and hit the student with a palm strike to the torso and sent him flying.  When Leung Jan learned what happened, he was highly upset and challenged Cheung Hung-sing to a closed doors Staff Duel.  No one knew about the outcome, but in the end, Cheung was definitely allowed to open his school in Fut San.

The lack of historical documentation by Cheung Hung-sing 

With a deeper look into China's history, one will know that Cheung Yim's Fut San Hung Sing Kwoon was well known to the Chinese Government for being a revolutionary martial arts school. This school was known to be part of the Hung Mun, the most despised Secret Society in the eyes of the Qing Empire, and capture suffered mandated instant beheadings (No Trial at all)for anyone connected to the Hung Mun Secret Society. Therefore, possessing any documentation or literature that could end your life instantly was not a smart idea for members of the Hung Sing Kwoon.  As a result, their history had to be passed down orally until the 1950s with Premier Zhou En Lai's (also a Hung Sing Disciple)personal instructions for Chen Yilin of the Fut San Hung Sing Kwoon (Student of Chan Ngau-sing) to officially document their history and was even given permission to mention Monk Ching Cho Wo Sheung in what is called "100 years, from Beginning To End,History of the Fut San Hung Sing Kwoon.

According to various sources, Cheung Yim parents were killed when he was very young (most likely due to revolutionary fighting) and was placed under the care of his uncle, Jeong Kwan.  When Cheung Yim was 7 or 8 years old he was a student of Li Yau-san. When Cheung Yim was 12 years old (1836), his uncle became unable to care of him, so he asked Li Yau-san's top senior student Chan Heung who had just returned from studying with Choy Fook 蔡褔, to take him in.  Chan Heung is internationally recognized as the first founder of the Choy Lee Fut martial arts system, with Cheung Hung Sing as being the co-founder.

Choy Fook 蔡褔 (Cai Fu)

According to legend, the monk Gee Sin Sim See 至善禪師 is said to have been one of the legendary Five Elders; Ng Mui五梅大師, Fung Doe Duk 馮道德, Miu Hin 苗顯 and Bak Mei 白眉道人; who survived the destruction of the Shaolin Temple during the late Qing dynasty.

The founders of the five major family styles of Southern Chinese martial arts; Hung Ga, Choy Gar, Mok Gar, Li Gar and Lau Gar, were respectively, Hung Hei-Gun 洪熙官, Choy Gau Yee 蔡九儀, Mok Da Si (Mok Ching-Kiu) 莫清矯, Li Yau-San 李友山 student of Li Sik Hoi, and Lau Sam-Ngan 劉三眼; and all are said to have been students of Gee Sin Sim See 至善禪師. Choy Fook 蔡褔 had learned his martial arts from Choy Gau Yee 蔡九儀, the founder of Choy Gar.

The following is evidence of some misinformation:

Chan Heung was impressed with Cheung Yim's Li Gar skills and wanted to teach him Choy Lee Fut, but found himself too busy perfecting and standardizing his newly created Choy Li Fut system to train fighters for the anti-Qing revolutionaries (that information has never been told in regards to history, ever). After a few years of doing maintenance work for Chan Heung, when Jeong Yim was 17, Chan Heung sent him out to locate and study under Choy Fook's successor (Choy Fook has nothing to do with monk Green Grass), Ching Cho 青草 to learn the art of Fut Gar and the philosophical ways of Buddhism.

TRUTH:
The quote "Chan Heung was impressed with Cheung Yim's Li Gar skills and wanted to teach him Choy Lee Fut, but found himself too busy perfecting and standardizing his newly created Choy Li Fut system to train fighters for the anti-Qing revolutionaries (that information has never been told in regards to history, ever)" is pure misinformation. This was never part of Cheung Yim's history at all.  The truth is Cheung Yim basically stole the Choy Lee Fut system by memorizing the techniques that Chan Heung taught in each lesson and practiced them in the middle of the night while everyone was sleeping. One night Chan Heung caught him practicing his stolen Choy Lee Fut. But, since Cheung Yim showed great skill while lacking proper instruction, he decided to teach Cheung Yim secretly since it was against the rules of the Chan Village in King Mui.

Cheung Yim's Choy Lee Fut training stopped when he got into a fight with some of Chan Heung's senior students that were bullying him.  He fought and defeated Chan Heung's students who then complained to their parents who in return complained to Chan Heung and forced him to make Cheung Yim leave the King Mui village.

Monk Ching Cho 青草和尚 (Qingcao)

According to legend and Hung Mun Triad history, Monk Ching Cho or Ching Cho Wo Sheung 青草和尚 (Qingcao) was one of the Ng Jing Wo Seung, (Five Book Monks) who took over the Jiulianshan Shaolin Temple, located in Putian County, Quanzhou, Fujian Province, after Gee Sin Sim See 至善禪師 left and went into hiding. At that time, Qing forces attacked the southern Shaolin temple and burned it down at the orders of the Qing Emperor. The temple made sure that head monk Gee Sim safely escaped, and left Ching Cho in charge  to continue the battle against the Qing troops. Plans were made to escape if the temple fell.

A traitor monk named Ma Chut (also known as Ma Ning-Yee or Ma Yee Fuk), who was banished from the temple, told the Qing troops about the escape plan and the vulnerability of the temple.  With that knowledge the Qing was able to successfully set the temple on fire.  Many monks were killed.  As the temple burned, 18 monks prayed in the main temple for salvation. When the main temple started burning and collapsing, a large curtain fell upon them.  The Qing troops believing that they had successfully destroyed both the temple and the monks left in victory.

The eighteen monks were protected from the fire by the curtain that fell upon them.  Choy Dak Jung kicked a hole in the wall of the temple and 18 monks escaped.  Unfortunately, most eventually died from smoke inhalation and burns. Out of the eighteen who escaped only five monks survived and were known as the Ng Jing Wo Seung. They were Wu Dak Dai, Choy Dak Jung, Lei Sik Hoi, Fong Dai Hung*, and Ma Chiu Hing. These are also the same Triad Five Elders of the Tian di hui/Hung Mun Secret Society.  Sifu Frank McCarthy goes into greater detail about the Green Grass Monk in his up-and-coming book on the American Hung Sing Kwoon

Once a secret Triad historical account, it revealed Ching Cho's real name was Fong Dai Hung and killed Ma Chut during their escape.  After their escape, Ching Cho 青草 went into hiding and lived somewhere near the Zhajian Temple on Mt. Pak Pai (Bapai) in Bapaishan, in Guangxi Province. Ching Cho 青草 is also known as the Green Grass Monk. Erroneously most disciples of Choy Lee Fut believed that Ching Cho (Green Grass) was a Shaolin Temple given name.  According to the research performed by Sifu Frank McCarthy, the root of the Ching Cho(Green Grass)name was found within the Triad Society and had nothing to do with the Shaolin Temple.

Historical controversy 

The origins of Cheung Yim's  Hung Sing (洪勝 Hung Victory) name, birth, and death dates sparked controversy. The one undisputed truth (agreed by all lineages)was Cheung Yim started as Chan Heung's student at the age of 12 years old. However, long ago, dates for Jeong Yim were not very clear. This is where the controversy began.

 In 1849, Cheung Yim was given the Hung Sing (洪勝 Hung Victory) name at the end of his training under Hung Mun co-founder Monk Ching Cho Wo Sheung (Green Grass Monk). The true origin of this name is deeply embedded within the Hung Mun/Tian Di Hui Secret Societies. Unlike Chan Heung's Great Sage 洪聖 (Hung Sing) which was in direct reference to an individual named Hung Wu, Cheung Hung Sing's Hung Victory name was in direct reference to the primary goal of the Hung Mun in overthrowing the Qing Empire.  Their full slogan was The Hung (洪) will be Victorious (勝)in overthrowing the Qing to restore the Ming back to power.

Misinformation #1 The origin of Cheung Yim's Hung Victory 洪勝 name:
Because of Cheung Yim's successful business and his famous name, many kung fu masters became jealous and challenged him to matches. Cheung Yim defeated all the challengers making him even more famous. At the time, the people only knew Cheung Yim's family name of Cheung and the school name of Hung Sing; therefore the people in Fut San thought his name was Cheung Hung Sing.

Truth:

The true birth of the Hung Sing (洪勝 Hung Victory) name given to Cheung Yim by the Green Grass Monk has its roots deeply set in the Secret Society of the Hung Mun 洪門.  It is found on the flags of the Hung Mun Secret Society as it is a condensed version of their ultimate goal, to overthrow the Qing dynasty for the atrocity of burning down the Southern Shaolin Temple, and murder most of the monks.  The monk Ching Cho was a co-founder of the Hung Mun 洪門 and by giving Cheung Yim this name of Hung Sing (洪勝 Hung Victory)was meant as a reminder of the struggle, and quest in honor of the slaughtered monks.

Misinformation #2 The birth of CHEUNG YIM:
While Fut San Hung Sing Kwoon was closed down in 1949, no one else around the world had a way of discovering the truth about the history and were left to their own devices. Some people came up with dates and information that ended up false information. Certain Choy Lee Fut factions believed Cheung Yim was ambushed, or even poisoned to death at a young age (some believed he died at 33 yrs old).

Truth: in 2001, Fut San Hung Sing Kwoon re-opened celebrating their 150th anniversary. The truth about Cheung Yim's birth and death was finally revealed. The elders have explained that Cheung Yim died at 69 years old in 1893. By subtracting 69 from 1893 one gets the date of 1824 as his true birth year. 
 
Misinformation death #3  The Cause of Cheung Yim's death:
How Cheung Yim died was unclear for a long time. Some have written that he was poisoned.  Other have claimed he was ambushed at 33 years old and died from his injuries.

Truth: Cheung Yim caught a severe cold, and died from his illness.

Misinformation #4 Who sent Cheung Yim to Fut San? :

Cheung Yim was the last batch of Chan Heung's students who was sent to Fut San by Chan Heung to take over Chan Din Foon's school and be his successor. The problem with this is there are two dates certain Choy Lee Fut factions give as dates for this situation. Those dates are 1848 and 1875.  Upon Cheung Yim's return to Chan Heung in King Mui after studying with Ching Cho for 8 years, increasing battles between anti-Qing government forces resulted in the collapse of the Fut San (Foshan) Hung Sing school in 1848, and the death of Chan Din-Foon 陳典桓. For the next 10 years he trained under Chan Heung's Choy Li Fut system.

Truth:

Cheung Yim was a student of Chan Heung in 1836 and trained under him until 1841 (12-17 yrs old), he was in fact part of the most earliest groups of students of Chan Heung.  Monk Ching Cho was the individual who instructed Cheung Yim to go to Fut San in 1849. It wasn't to take over anyone's school.  It was to open his own school to train Hung Mun revolutionary fighters and train them in preparation for the Tai Ping Rebellion. Then Cheung Yim officially opened his Hung Sing Kwoonin the year of 1851.  Additionally, Cheung Yim did take down Chan Din Foon's school name (Great Sage 洪聖舘 Hung Sing Kwoon) regardless of the date and replaced it with his own schools name Hung Sing Kwoon name 洪勝舘/鴻勝舘 (鴻勝舘 was the new name originating in 1867) proving he wasn't there to be Chan Din Foon or anyone's successor. NOTE: Cheung Yim did not come back and train with Heung for ten years. According to the history, the most time Cheung Yim trained under Chan Heung was for 5 years (1836-1841).

Misinformation #5 1867:
After a few years of learning Choy Lee Fut, in 1867, Chan Heung appointed him (Cheung Yim) to take over the Hung Sing Studio (Great Sage 洪聖舘 Hung Sing Kwoon) in Fut San (modern day FoShan), which was established in 1848 by Chan Din Yao and Chan Din Fune, two of Chan Heung's first students.

Truth:
Monk Ching Cho Wo Sheung was the one who sent Cheung Yim to Fut San in 1849. Monk Ching Cho sent him there because Fut San was a major location for the Hung Mun headquarters.  Cheung Yim's purpose in Fut San was to train Hung Mun revolutionary fighters for the up-and-coming Tai Ping Rebellion, not to spread the style of Choy Lee Fut. Virtually all over Fut San were Cheung Yim's Hung Sing Kwoon's setting up to train as many people as they could to fight in the revolution.

Misinformation #6 When Did Cheung Yim first go to Fut San?:

According to the Chan Family History Book, the only historically documented fact showing a relationship between Chan Heung 陳享 and Cheung Yim 張炎 is the date of 1867, and Chan Heung sent him to Fut San to become the successor of Chan Din Foon.

Truth:
The real truth is Cheung Yim opened his own Hung Sing Kwoon in Fut San in the year of 1851 (Historically recognized by the Fut San government), and it was forced to close down after end of the Tai Ping Rebellion (1864) because of Cheung Yim's involvement in the revolution.

Cheung Yim and Chan Heung both fled to Hong Kong in 1864 to avoid being captured and murdered at the hands of the Qing Empire. In 1867, they both returned to their respective cities to pick up where the left off. 
  
Misinformation #7 Lack of Historical Documentation:
Because of the lack of written documentation and physical evidence, it is difficult to ascertain the true history of Cheung Yim, and his life and contributions are still debated today.

Truth:
The lack of written historical information by Cheung Yim like there is from Chan Heung is due solely to the fact that Cheung Yim and his disciples were very active in the revolutionary movement during his lifetime. They could not afford to be found with any literature or connection to the Hung Mun secret society (which indeed they were) because they were in fear of having their heads decapitated on the spot, a mandate handed down from the Qing Empire because the Hung Mun was the most despised and feared Chinese Secret Society.

Misinformation #8  Nim Fut San Yen Book:
Back to the old days, the Chinese respected the teacher and it was not appropriate to question your teacher's background or the history of the kung fu system. After a time, the students thought their teacher, "Cheung Hung Sing", was the founder of the Hung Sing Studio. In Canton, there was a kung fu storybook writer whose pen name was Nim Fut San Yen. He wrote a fictional storybook about the Fut San's Hung Sing Studio.

After that book was published, all the Hung Sing students in Fut San treated the book as though it were the history of their kung fu system. This book also lead them to believe that Cheung Yim and Chan Heung were the co-founders of the Choy Li Fut system. However, as there are no dates nor are there correct names of the places, there is really nothing to verify the validity of the story.

Truth:

No one has ever read the book in mention. However it can be found online now. The history has always been orally transmitted and when compared to information from other Fut San Hung Sing Kwoon lineages we all seemed to share the same basic information. It never came from that book in mention.

In regards to the belief that Cheung Yim was a co-founder to the Choy Lee Fut system, the idea did not come from a book. It came about by examining the history under a microscope. According to the Fut San version of the history, Cheung Yim reunited in Hong Kong. It is even written that Cheung Yim and Chan Heung instructed an alleged member of the Chan Family Association from San Francisco and shared with him the Choy Lee Fut secret codes to use.

In the time Chan Heung and Cheung Yim spent in Hong Kong, Cheung Yim gave Chan Heung some of the Fut Gar Kuen he learned from the Monk Ching Cho.  Together they added in new techniques into the Choy Lee Fut system, and that is where the idea of Cheung Yim's contribution to the further advancement of the Choy Lee Fut making him a co-founder of sorts.

The Fut San Hung Sing School 

The Fut San Hung Sing 佛山鴻勝舘 (Hung/Great Victory) Kwoon was formally established in 1851 using these characters 佛山洪勝舘, in perfect timing with the Tai Ping Rebellion. Cheung Hung Sing was ordered (by Monk Ching Cho - NOT by Chan Heung) to go to Fut San once his gung fu training was complete under the Monk Ching Cho (Green Grass). The sole purpose of Cheung Hung Sing being in Fut San was aid in the Tai Rebellion and train the revolutionary fighters for war.   Cheung Yim was a Red Pole (426) aka Hung Kwun within the Hung Mun Secret Society.  This means he held a position of what can be considered as a General of an army within the secret society.

During and after the Tai Ping Rebellion was over(1851-1864), Cheung Yim and the students of the Fut San Hung Sing Kwoon (great Victory School)were on the run all the while opening multiple other Hung Sing Kwoons in various locations. Between 1864 and 1867 Cheung Hung Sing and Chan Heung were both in Hong Kong and this is where they reunited for a solid three years. It is here that Cheung Yim shared the Green Grass Monk's Fut Gar Kuen with Chan Heung as a form or repayment for all the generosity and hospitality he was shown. At this point, Chan Heung viewed Cheung Yim more as a brother than a former disciple. Together they came up with new techniques and included them into Chan Heung's Choy Lee Fut. This was the point of Cheung Hung Sing's returned to the Choy Lee Fut family.

The year 1856:

According to the Hong Kong Chan Heung Memorial Association of 1972, Cheung Yim defeated a local bully by the name of Zhao Juan, who knew Cheung Yim was the best student of Chan Heung and wanted any excuse to challenge him.  He was also the owner of the ferry business, and used this incident to do so.  The story claimed Cheung Yim and Zhao Juan fought many rounds and were pretty much tied.  Chan Heung was in the audience and as they prepared earlier, Chan Heung would applause when he sees an opening for Cheung Yim to defeat the bully.  Chan Heung began applauding and Cheung Yim knew it was time to use the "Continuous Lightning cutting palms" which turned out to be the end of Zhao Juan, whose students left him and joined Cheung Yim's school.  
  
The years 1864-1867

While in Hong Kong a San Francisco representative of the Chan Family Association met with Chan Heung and Cheung Yim.  According to the Chan Heung memorial Association in Hong Kong, it mentions Chan Heung sharing Choy Lee Fut's secret code words that were based on the sounds that Cheung Hung Sing made while demonstrating Choy Lee Fut. These secret code words were Yik (when striking) Wah (when using the Tiger Claw) and Tik (when kicking). They were created because if unaware students of both Chan Heung and Cheung Hung Sing happen to cross paths and get into a fight, the use of tiger claw will alert them that you are part of the family belonging to the Green Grass Monk.

The Year 1867:

the now 43 year old Cheung Hung Sing returned to Fut San to re-open his Hung Sing Kwoon 佛山洪勝舘 but needed to change the name of the original and banned school to avoid further detection from the Qing government. By replacing the Hung 洪 word with another Hung 鴻 he managed to successfully re-open his school under the new name of Hung Sing Kwoon 鴻勝舘.

Cheung Yim's Hung Sing Choy Lee Fut aka Hung Sing Fut Gar Kuen was primarily focused on combative training. He taught a low number of forms for a reason. He and his school were constantly going to war with the Chinese government and forms are not what you use to train when you train to fight.

Curriculum of Cheung Hung Sing Choy Lee Fut 
Since the orientation of the school was for combat training the Hung Sing has fewer hand sets;eight as their primary core. The Hung Sing branch is known for its aggressive fighting methods such as continuous non-stop combinations and exaggerated side stance techniques, as well as some aggressive weapons forms. This curriculum was designed so anti-Qing rebels could quickly gain practical proficiency in unarmed and weapons combat.

In addition to the eight hand forms, there was one extremely long hand form passed down from Monk Ching Cho to Jeong Yim called In and Out Bagua Kuen (Internal and External Bagua Fist)with 1080 moves in it. That form was broken into 3 separate different hand forms by Chan Ngau Sing called Cheung Kuen, Ping Kuen and Kau Da Kuen, an apparatus training form called Che Kuen (Pulling Fist) is taught. The wooden dummy (Ching Jong) apparatus of the Hung Sing branch is referred to as the "Side Body Balance Dummy" designed to mimic the Hung Sing style side body opening salutation. They have a variety of unique weapon and hand sparring forms to teach the practical use of the system.

Death controversy 
How and when Jeong Yim died is unknown.  Some say he died from injuries resulted by fighting at an early age of 33, others say he died of pneumonia in his later years.  There is one story about how Jeong Yim died which is impossible if he taught Chan Ngau Sing in 1883, which is proven with established records of the now existing family.

One evening while walking along the pier to catch a ferry, Jeong Yim saw some men engaged in a fight. He stepped in to intervene. He was shocked when both men turned against him, and found that many other men, some with weapons, surrounded him. He had no choice but to fight, using the only weapon he had, an umbrella. He killed three of his assailants, wounded many others, while the others ran away. Seriously wounded, Jeong Yim managed to struggle back to his school, but due to the severity of his wounds, he later died. Jeong Yim was only thirty-three years old at the time of his death which puts his death in 1848 but recorded history says he taught Chan Sing 1883 until 1893
this to is also an impossibility.

There is another story about how Jeong Yim died.  After being involved with many anti-Qing revolutionary battles, in 1848 the head of the Fut San school Chan Din-Foon 陳典桓 died.  Chan Heung asked Jeong Yim if he would reopen the Fut San school using his own Name and different Characters which were given to him by his teacher Ching Cho, Green Grass Monk (Fong, Dai Hung) his Fut Style teacher and Hung Moon Mentor For revolutionary principles whom he learned from for 8-'10 years. In his later years, he contracted pneumonia and died of a lung infection in 1893 at the age of about 69.

The legacy of Cheung Yim 

After the deaths of Cheung Yim in 1893 and Chan Ngau Sing in 1926, many students of the Fut San Great Victory (Hung Sing) dispersed and spread to various area's of Asia and the United States. Some of their students were Yuen Hai 阮系 (Lau Bun's Teacher) Lei Can, Huang Kuan, Zhang Sam bing, Tan Li, Huang Sei. took over Hong Kong Hung Sing Kwoon, Tarm Narp (Nap), Lui Charn (Tam Sam's Teacher), Tong Gun Sing, Sook Gong, and Lay Yun (Lau Chung's teacher).

Yuen Hai 阮系 (? - Early 1900s) was a high ranking senior student of Cheung Yim 張炎-張洪勝宗師 that died between 1900 and 1920. While new information is constantly being discovered, Yuen Hai had lots of students.  Their names have been lost to time, except as recorded in 1972, he had a student by the name of Mok Man Yan 莫民恩 whose father hired Yuen Hai and someone else to become his son's kung fu instructors.  Later on, he went to train under Chan Yiu Chi (possibly because Yuen Hai passed away or moved away) for 6 years. Mok Man Yan was a very respected acupuncture Dr, who also trained in internal medicine under a Dr Chen Cunren 陳存仁 in an acupuncture association. He later moved to Hong Kong and set up his practice there and became very well known in that industry after the war.  Some of Mok's student's were Mok Yiu Wah 莫耀華, Chan Bing 陳炳, Yip Lim 葉廉, Ho Jung Sing 何宗聲, Leung Fai 梁輝.

The Fut San Hung Sing Kwoon lineage 

Chan Ngau Sing(1864-1926 born on Ngar Pong St.) also known as Chan Gok Choy, and  Chan Gei Sing, and his nickname was Ngau Sing was the 1st successor of the Fut San Hung Sing school 佛山鴻勝館. First, studied Hung Ga Kuen under Jow Gum Biu from about 14 years of age until he was 19 years old.  In 1883, Yuen Hai 阮系 convinced Chan Ngau Sing to come over to the Fut San Hung Sing Kwoon at Cheung Hung Sing's request.  Once he agreed to become Cheung Hung Sing's student, he stayed loyal to Cheung Hung Sing until he passed away.  Chan Ngau Sing learned the "In and out bagua Kuen" of the Fut Gar system  that  Monk Ching Cho taught to Cheung Yim between 1841 and 1849. In this hand form, there were 1080 moves in it, and was the essence of the Green Grass Monk's system.

(* New information about the relationship between Yuen Hai and Chan Ngau Sing claims before being Cheung Hung Sing's and Jow Gum Biu's students, Chan Ngau Sing studied Hung Gar under Yuen Hai as well).

The new generation of students of the Fut San Hung Sing Kwoon were getting harder to teach, so to make things easier for his students, Chan Ngau Sing broke up the In and Out Bagua Kuen into three different forms. Cheung Kuen, Ping Kuen, and Kau Da Kuen were the names of these new forms.  Note: these are NOT the same forms taught within Chan Heung lineages.

Evil people were one of Chan Ngau Sing's pet peeves.  He was such an honorable man that often treated bad people as his personal enemies.  One day, a well known local bully from the "Sing Tong" named Ying Sha.  He was one of those people Chan Ngau Sing despised.  Ying Sha had more than 100 people under him, and he also enjoyed causing trouble where ever he went, and often took advantage of the villagers whenever he could. On one of these occasions, someone ran to Chan Ngau Sing and informed him that Ying Sha and his group were at the Ancestral Temple causing trouble.  Chan Ngau Sing was incensed, he grabbed a pair of CLF hammers and rushed over to the temple and caught Ying Sha in the act.  Singlehandedly, Chan Ngau Sing atteacked and killed Ying Sha and his followers, then made a public announcement to the audience that the first three rows were now based on a First Come First Serve basis,  making him sort of a local hero.

Towards the end of the Ching dynasty, Chan Ngau Sing would teach his students that "the strong should never bully the weak, and small groups should never bully individuals.  He was a very strict teacher who installed a set of rules, and  placed a strong emphasis on perfecting the basics.  Chan Ngau Sing also made it a point to personally teach every single student himself for more than 30 years straight.

Aside from gung fu, Chan Ngau Sing also had his own metals business, but that wasn't doing too well.  And if that wasn't enough, once again  the Chinese Government tried to arrest the members and close down the Hung Sing Kwoon.  Yet this time in 1900, Chan Ngau Sing fled to Hong Kong and stayed with his Si-Hing Yuen Hai (Lau Bun's teacher).  During his stay there, Chan Ngau Sing managed to beat up a British Police officer in Hong Kong and had to flee back into Fut San to avoid being arrested.

While back in Fut San Chan Ngau Sing began setting up some very strict rules.  Personally he was against public Lion Dances because he felt it would bring too much attention to their school.  So the Lui Chung and Hip Lien Lion Dance Societies were set up where he was the head master.  However, all of the members of these two Lion Dance groups were secretly Hung Sing members which numbered over 10,000 students.

In Fut San, Chan Ngau Sing's name carried much weight.  His name was so famous that anyone wishing to open a school in the area regardless of who they belonged to always paid him a visit to ask his permission first.  Over time, Chan Ngau Sing changed his mind about teaching revolutionary groups.  Many of his students were members of the Communist Workers and Farmers Unions.  Most of his students were forced to open Hung Sing Kwoon's overseas to avoid being arrested as well.  At the time, the Fut San Hung Sing Kwoon was constantly in the local news.

Chan Ngau Sing's strict governance of the Hung Sing Kwoon, set the bar high in the martial arts circle of Fut San.  He developed new rules, new routines, etc. for the new students of the Hung Sing Kwoon. For example, all new students would have to come by recommendation only from someone who was already a student. Once the new student was interviewed and believed to have good morals, not a bully, not a gangster, the student would be accepted into the Hung Sing Kwoon. In times of peace, Chan Ngau Sing emphasized to his students that the strong will not bully the weak, and they would not cause trouble in public and bring negative attention upon the school.  If an apprentice makes trouble for no reason and fights with others, he will be called to the hall to warn and punish him. This way, Chan Ngau Sing could weed through the bad seeds and maintain the high integrity of the Fut San Hung Sing Kwoon.

The main reason Chan Ngau Sing was being so selective in who got to learn what  is that some people with bad behaviors learn the inner boxing and use it for bad intentions. In order to prevent disciples from stubbornly fighting, in addition to strict law enforcement, Chan Ngau Sing also paid attention to lead by example. When Chan Ngau Sing saw that lion dance was easy to get into trouble, he stipulated that Hung Sing Kwoon was not allowed to set up Lion Dance group.

In his later years, Chan Ngau Sing was shot and injured his leg by a boxer in a martial arts hall. A group of Chan Ngau Sing apprentices wanted the boxer to be arrested and punished for shooting Chan Ngau Sing, who then pointed at the boxer running away in the opposite direction then fled the scene himself saying nothing more. He didn't want to cause a scene over of his injury. Although the Hung Sing Kwoon has always emphasized not to get into fights, but things happen. Especially to those foreign trouble makers who are extremely vicious and powerful.

Some of Chan Ngau Sing's famous students were Qian Wei Fang, Wu Qin, Liang Hui Hua, Tong Sek, and more who were all involved in the revolution.  Wu Qin became a revolutionary martyr, and bodyguard to Dr. Sun Yat Sen.    On October 13, 1926, in the midst of all his poverty, Chan Ngau Sing passed away after falling ill and was buried in the Mong Ching Gong cemetery. There were more than 5,000 people who attended his funeral.  Today, his legacy is being carried on by his true bloodline. His Grand son and Great Grand Daughter (Cho Chi Han)  who was born on December 29, 1985, and still resides in Fut San until this day, practicing the gung her great-grandfather passed down.   Cho Chi Han has been entering and winning local competitions with her gung fu. Sometime in the future she would be able to step up and take over where he grand father, the legendary Chan Ngau Sing left off.

Chan Ngau Sing's students: Ho Cheung 何祥 was a student of Qian Wai-Fong 錢維方 and Tong Sek 湯錫. 
Ho, Cheuk Wah 何焯華 is the son of Ho, Cheung 何祥  and student of Ho Yee 何儀 who was a student of Wong Say student of Cheung Hung Sing and Chan Ngau Sing. Li Guanghui, Liang Hui Hua,

The USA lineage of Fut San Hung Sing Choy Lee Fut (Cheung Yim's line)
Lau Bun 劉彬 was the last disciple of Master Yuen Hai 阮系宗師, who, was a senior student of Cheung Hung Sing 張炎(張鴻勝) . Lau Bun 劉彬宗師 (1891-1967) was the 1st master to branch outside of China and establish a School on foreign soil.  He opened the first and oldest existing kung fu school in the United States of America, headquartered in San Francisco, California and officially established in 1939, but unofficially Hung Sing Choy Lee Fut was teaching Tong members in America during the early 1920s.  He (Lau Bun) is also the first master to take Hung Sing Choy Lee Fut 鴻勝蔡李佛拳 and establish a Hung Sing Kwoon 鴻勝舘 outside of China.

Students of Professor Lau Bun 劉彬宗師: Jew Leong 宗師周亮 (1926-2010), Chan Bing-Tong 陳炳棠 (1917 - 1968), E.Y. Lee 李日華 and Doc-Fai Wong 黄德輝, Denny Lai, Bob Louie, Sam Louie(? - 2020), Clifford Wong, Susan Der, Larry Young, Aunt May, Adeline Louie, Tin Hall, Mike Wong.  Wee Gee, Howard Lee, Lucky Fong, Lincoln Fong, Roger Wong, Roy (Wong?), and many more were all students of Lau Bun. Doc-Fai Wong 黄德輝 founded the International Plum Blossom Federation in San Francisco, California in 1986. in 1967, Jew Leong became Lau Bun's first Successor of the Hung Sing Kwoon 金山鴻勝舘.

Jew, Leong 周亮 (1926-2010): Aka. Jimmy Ming Jew. Began studying the Hung Sing Choy Lee Fut system at the age of 14 years old in San Francisco's Chinatown under Professor Lau Bun, but studied Hung Gar as a child in China. He was a high ranking senior disciple, and  Hop Sing and Ghee Kung Tong brother along with Professor Lau Bun. Jew Leong started teaching under his own name at the Ghee Tuk Sam Tuck family association while his teacher was still alive.  In 1967 when Professor Lau Bun died, Jew Leong stepped forward uncontested and took control of the Hung Sing Kwoon and moved it to the Chinese Freemason building on Spofford alley.

In 1987, Professor Jew Leong went into semi-retirement and named Dennis Jew Tien Loong Salvatera as the person he is leaving in charge of Hung Sing Kwoon affairs.  In 1995, the professor officially went into full-time retirement, after dedicating more than 50 years of his life to the promotion and development of Hung Sing Choy Lee Fut in America.  He then handed the school and its legacy to the capable hands of Dennis "Dino" Salvatera.

In 2010 at the age of 84 years old, Jimmy Ming Jew aka Jew Leong (Lang), the first successor of Lau Bun's legacy passed away and is buried at the Chinese Cemetery in Daly City, California.  His students were Dino Salvatera, Mike Kwan, Matthew Huey, Tenny Lee, David Jew, Larry Johnson, Charles Wong, Briggy Villalon, Joe Soriano (Fat Joe), Kenny,  Sheila Yee, Bernice Lau,David Dea, Wyman Tom (more to come) Milton Lee Morris Lee, Silas Lee, Lily Jew, Mona Jew, Sharlene Lee, Alan Clauson 周地龍 (In time, we will add more names, as there are a ton of you so don't feel left out...your name will be up soon enough).

Dino Jew Salvatera 周天龍:  was first a student of Chan Bing-Tong 陳炳棠, moved to the Hung Sing Kwoon under Jew Leong 周亮, and with the blessings of Jew Leong, he became a student of Fut-San Hung Sing Kwoon Elder Ho, Cheuk Wah, 何焯華.

Students of GM Dino Salvatera: 
Hannibal Yusef: Is the Dai Si Hing of the Tien Loong Gung Fu club, GM Dino Salvatera's very first student.
Valerie Lee
Bryan Jang
Frank McCarthy 周洪龍 is a student of both Dino Jew Salvatera 周天龍 and Lok Gee Hung骆志洪  of Fut San Hung Sing Kwoon 佛山鴻勝館.
Students of Frank McCarthy: Jim Carroll, Neal Headley,Che Shul,Andre Bravo, Carlos, Ben Liu, Robert Knight.
Stan Hall
Bernice(Lau)Lew
Alan Clauson 周地龍
Irene Kwan
Troy Dunwood

Students of Doc-Fai Wong 黄德輝 include Jason J. Wong 黄志刚, Jaime Marquez, Vern Miller, Nathan Fisher, Alan Hubbard, David Dong, Pedro Rico, Neil McRitchie, Munzer Dejani, Sebastian Gonzales, Evelina Lengyel, Jo Hardy, Roberto Fasano, Pawel Kijañczyk, Mark Horton and Michael Punschke.

Lui Charn lineage of Fut San Hung Sing Kwoon 

Lui Charn, Tong Gun Sing, and Sook Gong, opened a school at Ho-Nam in Canton.

Master Lui Charn (Lui Chun, Lei Can) was born in Kaiping County, Guangdong, and was a disciple of Cheung Hung Sing, the ancestor of the Fut San Hung Sing Kwoon.  He has been adept at martial arts since he was young, and has a great skill in learning art, and is good at using scales.  Later he went to Guangzhou Lianjing to set up an apprentice. His apprentices were: Tam Sam, Lau Cheung, Huang Tao, Huang Sen, Zhong Tai, Liu You ...

Lay Yun (Lee Yan) lineage of Fut San Hung Sing Kwoon 
Lay Yun was a student of Jeong Yim 張炎 and taught in Canton. Lau Chung, Wong Lo Lik, Hung Duk Gong, Choy Yee Kiu, Chan Say Yu, Bung Hau Seung, Choy Yut Kiu (Kiew), and Fong Yuk Shi were all students of Lay Yun.

Tarm Narp was a student of Lay Yun. Tarm Narp's son, Tarm Ngau, taught in China and Tarm Fu was an herbalist in Hong Kong.

Choy Yut Kiu (Kiew) was a student of Lay Yun. Choy Yut Kiu's student, Kwan Man Keng, formed the "Hung Sheng (Sing) Chinese Koontow and Lion Dance Society in Singapore in 1965. Fong Yuk Shi was a student of Lay Yun. Some of Fong Yuk Shi's students were Chan Hon Hung, Lum Siu Larp, and Chan Yiu-Chi 陳耀墀 (Chan Heung's grandson).

LAU Chung lineage 
Lau Chung's student Gee Duk Choy died in 1968 in Indonesia.  Lai Yun eventually settled there and began teaching.

Buk Sing lineage 
Lui Charn, a student of Jeong Yim, had a student named Tam Sam 譚三 (1873 - 1942). Tam Sam started the Buk Sing Branch of Choy Li Fut after being expelled by Lui Charn for excessive fighting within his school. After his expulsion, Tam Sam 譚三 asked some of Lui Charn's students to help him open a new Choy Li Fut branch in the Guangzhou, Siu Buk 小北 (little north) district and called it Siu Buk Hung Sing Choy Li Fut. Tam Sam's 譚三 students referred to themselves just as the Buk Sing Choy Li Fut school so eventually the name was shortened.

A Northern Shaolin master named Ku Yu Jeong (Gu Ruzhang) befriended and joined Tam Sam 譚三 and added more techniques to the Bak Sing Choy Li Fut style.  Thus Bak Sing Choy Li Fut branch evolved differently when compared to the Hung Sing and King Mui branches.  This evolution is reflected in differences in both forms and curriculum.

Kong On, Lai Chou, and Lung Tse Cheung, were some of Tam Sam's students. Lai Hung was a student of Lai Chou and Lung Tse Cheung.  Dave Lacey (1943-2019) and Vince Lacey (1943-2019) are twin brothers and both were students of Kong Hing and Lai Hung. Shane Lacey is the son and student of his father Vince Lacey (Lay Wing Sang. Jason Lacey is the son and student of Dave Lacey.

References and sources 

Choy Li Fut info from China
 :zh:蔡李佛拳

Chinese martial artists
Qing dynasty people
Sportspeople from Guangdong
People from Xinhui District